Anthony Ireland (born September 25, 1991) is an American professional basketball player for HydroTruck Radom of the PLK.

Professional career
On October 18, 2018, Ireland signed with Russian team Avtodor Saratov of the VTB United League.

On May 4, 2021, he has signed with HydroTruck Radom of the PLK.

References

External links
NBADraft.net profile
Loyola Marymount Lions profile
Eurobasket.com profile

1991 births
Living people
American expatriate basketball people in France
American expatriate basketball people in Greece
American expatriate basketball people in Lithuania
American expatriate basketball people in Poland
American expatriate basketball people in Russia
American men's basketball players
Arkadikos B.C. players
Basketball players from Connecticut
BC Avtodor Saratov players
BC Juventus players
Élan Chalon players
Loyola Marymount Lions men's basketball players
Point guards
S.L. Benfica basketball players
Sportspeople from Waterbury, Connecticut
Trefl Sopot players